For Beauty's Sake is a 1941 American comedy film directed by Shepard Traube and written by Walter Bullock, Ethel Hill and Wanda Tuchock. The film stars Ned Sparks, Marjorie Weaver, Ted North, Joan Davis, Pierre Watkin and Lenita Lane. The film was released on June 6, 1941, by 20th Century Fox.

Plot

Cast   
Ned Sparks as Jonathan B. Sweet
Marjorie Weaver as Dime Pringle
Ted North as Bertram Erasmus Dillsome
Joan Davis as Dottie Nickerson
Pierre Watkin as Middlesex
Lenita Lane as Dorothy Sawter
Richard Lane as Mr. Jackman
Lotus Long as Ann Kuo
Glenn Hunter as Rodney Blynn
Lois Wilson as Mrs. Lloyd Kennar
John Ellis as Lloyd Kennar
Olaf Hytten as Father McKinley
Tully Marshall as Julius H. Pringle
Phyllis Fraser as Julia
Isabel Jewell as Amy Devore
Nigel De Brulier as Brother
Janet Beecher as Miss Merton
Margaret Dumont as	Mrs. Franklin Evans
Helena Phillips Evans as Mrs. Jellico

References

External links 
 

1941 films
20th Century Fox films
American comedy films
1941 comedy films
Films with screenplays by Wanda Tuchock
Films produced by Darryl F. Zanuck
American black-and-white films
1940s English-language films
1940s American films